The Art of Video Games was an exhibition by the Smithsonian American Art Museum which was on display from March 16, 2012 through September 30, 2012. The exhibition was designed to highlight the evolution of art within the video game medium over its forty-year history. Following its time at the Smithsonian American Art Museum, the exhibition toured to 10 additional venues in the United States. Chris Melissinos, founder of Past Pixels and collector of video games and gaming systems, was the curator of the exhibition.

Purpose
The Art of Video Games was one of the first exhibitions to explore the forty-year evolution of video games as an artistic medium, with a focus on striking visual effects and the creative use of new technologies. It featured some of the most influential artists and designers during five eras of game technology, from early pioneers to contemporary designers (see grid below). The exhibition focused on the interplay of graphics, technology and storytelling through some of the best games for twenty gaming systems ranging from the Atari VCS to the PlayStation 3.

Smithsonian previously had coin-op arcade games on display in the mid-1980s, including the arcade video games Pong, Pac-Man and Dragon's Lair.

Public vote
The Smithsonian American Art Museum invited the public to help select the video games to be included in the exhibition. The 240 games on the ballot were selected by Chris Melissinos, who worked with the museum and an advisory group consisting of game developers, designers, industry pioneers and journalists. The games were selected based on a variety of criteria, including visual effects, creative use of new technologies and how the game fit into the narrative of the exhibition. Voting took place between February 14 and April 17, 2011. More than 3.7 million votes were cast by 119,000 people in 175 countries.

Galleries
Visitors to The Art of Video Games at the Smithsonian American Art Museum were greeted by a 12-foot projection that included excerpts from most of the 80 games featured in the exhibition with a chipmusic soundtrack written and recorded by 8 Bit Weapon and ComputeHer. An interior gallery included a series of short videos showing the range of emotional responses players of all ages have while interacting with games. Five themed videos addressing the themes of Beginnings, Inspiration, Narrative, Experience and The Future showcased excerpts from interviews with 20 influential figures in the gaming world—Nolan Bushnell, David Cage, Steve Cartwright, Jenova Chen, Don Daglow, Noah Falstein, Ed Fries, Ron Gilbert, Robin Hunicke, Henry Jenkins, Jennifer MacLean, RJ Mical, Mike Mika, David Perry, Jane Pinckard, George L. Rose, Kellee Santiago, Tim Schafer, Jesse Schell, Warren Spector and Tommy Tallarico. The videos are also available on the museum's website. A five-channel installation displaying advances in core mechanics illustrated how home video games have evolved dramatically since their introduction in the 1970s through elements like avatars, jumping, running, climbing, flying, cutscenes and landscapes. The room also held a selection of concept art from several games of different eras. Five playable games, one from each era, showed how players interact with diverse virtual worlds, highlighting innovative techniques that set the standard for many subsequent games. The playable games were Pac-Man, Super Mario Brothers, The Secret of Monkey Island, Myst, and Flower. Interactive kiosks in the final gallery covered five eras of game technology, from early pioneers to contemporary designers, and 20 gaming systems from Atari VCS to PlayStation 3. Each kiosk featured a game from each of four genres—action, target, adventure and tactics—that visitors could select to listen to commentary, game dialogue and music.

Games exhibited

The following list of games are those that were selected by Melissinos and the advisory board for inclusion in the exhibition. The exhibition is divided into five chronological eras, showcasing platforms from within that era. For each platform, three games from each of four game genres were initially selected for inclusion, with one game determined by the public voting to be part of the final exhibition. In addition, playable versions of five games are available: Pac-Man, Super Mario Bros., The Secret of Monkey Island, Myst, and Flower.

Era 1: Start! (1970s–1983)

Era 2: 8-bit (1983–1989)

Era 3: Bit Wars! (1989–1994)

Era 4: Transition (1995–2002)

Era 5: Next Generation (2003–current)

Subsequent exhibitions
Following its time at the Smithsonian, the exhibit was also shown at ten other venues across the United States, between 2013 and 2016.

Smithsonian American Art Museum in Washington, D.C. (March 16, 2012 – September 30, 2012)
Boca Raton Museum of Art in Boca Raton, Florida (October 24, 2012 – January 13, 2013)
EMP Museum in Seattle, Washington (February 16, 2013 – May 13, 2013)
Phoenix Art Museum in Phoenix, Arizona (June 16, 2013 – September 29, 2013)
Everson Museum of Art in Syracuse, New York (October 25, 2013 – January 19, 2014)
Hudson River Museum in Yonkers, New York (February 15, 2014 – May 18, 2014)
Toledo Museum of Art in Toledo, Ohio (June 19, 2014 – September 28, 2014)
Flint Institute of Arts in Flint, Michigan (October 25, 2014 – January 18, 2015)
Chrysler Museum of Art in Norfolk, Virginia (February 13, 2015 – May 10, 2015)
Memphis Brooks Museum of Art in Memphis, Tennessee (June 6, 2015 – September 13, 2015)
The Patricia and Phillip Frost Art Museum at Florida International University in Miami, Florida (October 9, 2015 – January 25, 2016)

Book
A companion book, The Art of Video Games: From Pac-Man to Mass Effect, accompanies the exhibition. It is written by Chris Melissinos, with a foreword by Elizabeth Broun, director of the Smithsonian American Art Museum and an introduction by Mike Mika, head of development for Other Ocean Interactive and a prominent advocate for the preservation of video game history. It also includes more than 100 composite images of games created by Patrick O'Rourke. The book was published by Welcome Books in cooperation with the Smithsonian American Art Museum.

Reception

An estimated 680,000 visitors came to the Smithsonian exhibit during its six-month display period.

The following is a sample of media coverage of the exhibition:
Kohler, Chris. "Game|Life - Videogames Politely Invade Smithsonian Art Museum." Wired. 30 March 2012.
Goldberg, Harold. "How The Smithsonian Screwed Up Its Video Game Exhibition." NPR. 26 March 2012.
Bradner, Liesl. "Smithsonian scores with 'Art of Video Games' exhibit." The Los Angeles Times. 19 March 2012.
Braver, Rita. ""The art of video games" with Rita Braver." CBS Sunday Morning. 18 March 2012.
Kennicott, Philip. "Critic's Review: 'The Art of Video Games' at the Smithsonian American Art Museum." The Washington Post. 18 March 2012.
Schiesel, Seth. "An Exhibition in Easy Mode." The New York Times. 16 March 2012.
O'Brien, Jane. "Video game art gets the gallery treatment." BBC News. 15 March 2012.
Snider, Mike. "Are video games art? Draw your own conclusions." USA Today. 13 March 2012.
Mustich, Emma. "Five-Minute Museum - Video games as multi-player art project." Salon''. 10 March 2012.

See also
Game On – a similar exhibition that explores the historical development of video games
Game Masters (exhibition) – a similar exhibition at the Australian Centre for the Moving Image that explores key designers of the video game medium
List of video games in the Museum of Modern Art – a list of video games in a similar, but smaller exhibition of the Museum of Modern Art

References

External links

Smithsonian American Art Museum The Art of Video Games exhibition information
The Art of Video Games voting site
Curator interview, exhibition trailer and artist interviews
The Art Of Video Games: From Pac-Man To Mass Effect book website

Art exhibitions in the United States
Smithsonian Institution exhibitions
Video game exhibitions
Video gaming in the United States
2012 in Washington, D.C.